84 Squadron or 84th Squadron may refer to:

 No. 84 Squadron RAAF, a unit of the Royal Australian Air Force 
 No. 84 Squadron RAF, a unit of the United Kingdom Royal Air Force 
 84th Flying Training Squadron, a unit of the United States Air Force 
 VF-84 (Fighter Squadron 84), a unit of the United States Navy 
 HSC-84 (Helicopter Sea Combat Squadron 84), a unit of the United States Navy

See also
 84th Division (disambiguation)
 84th Wing (disambiguation)
 84th Regiment (disambiguation)